Reyna Isis (Yaksiry Palacios) is the ring name of a Mexican luchadora enmascarada, or female masked professional wrestler. She started her career as a valet for the group Los Guerreros Tuareg in Consejo Mundial de Lucha Libre (CMLL), but later transitioned into an in-ring worker. She currently portrays a ruda ring character (the antagonists of wrestling) as she wrestled for CMLL, on the Mexican independent circuit and in Japan. Her ring name is Spanish for "Queen Isis" and her ring gear alludes to the original Eyptian Queen Isis with her veil-like mask.

She is a former Mexican National Women's Champion. She lost her mask against La Jarochita at the CMLL 89th Anniversary Show.

Championships and accomplishments
Consejo Mundial de Lucha Libre
Mexican National Women's Championship (1 time)

Luchas de Apuestas record

Footnotes

References

Living people
Masked wrestlers
Mexican female professional wrestlers
Unidentified wrestlers
Year of birth missing (living people)
Mexican National Women's Champions